Johnny Hansen (March 25, 1964) is a Danish former association football player. Born in Copenhagen, he played as a midfielder for Danish clubs Hvidovre IF, Ikast fS, Vejle BK, and Herning Fremad, as well as Sturm Graz in Austria. He played two games for the Denmark national football team in 1989.

External links
Danish national team profile 
Danish Superliga statistics
Vejle BK profile

1964 births
Danish men's footballers
Denmark international footballers
Hvidovre IF players
SK Sturm Graz players
Ikast FS players
Vejle Boldklub players
Living people
Association football midfielders
Footballers from Copenhagen